Irina Khromacheva was the defending champion, but retired in the quarterfinals against Valentini Grammatikopoulou.

Richèl Hogenkamp won the title, defeating Kristie Ahn in the final, 6–2, 6–4.

Seeds

Draw

Finals

Top half

Bottom half

References
Main Draw

Engie Open Saint-Gaudens Occitanie - Singles